The X-Trail Jam is a Japanese snowboarding contest and one of the biggest of its kind worldwide. It was first launched in the Tokyo Dome, Japan in 2001 and is now held annually. President and main developer is Reto Lamm.

Winners

External links 
Official site
TTR 6Star Event Bio of the X-Trail Jam

Snowboarding competitions
International sports competitions hosted by Japan
Nissan